Symbrenthia hypselis, the Himalayan jester, is a species of nymphalid butterfly found in South Asia, and some islands in South East Asia (Sumatra, Java)

See also
List of butterflies of India (Nymphalidae)

References

Nymphalini
Butterflies of Asia
Butterflies described in 1824